The St. Johns Town Center is an upscale super-regional open-air mall in southeast Jacksonville, Florida. It opened its doors on March 18, 2005 with over 167 stores, many of which were new to the Jacksonville market at the time. The  mall is located at the intersection of J. Turner Butler Boulevard and the Interstate 295 East Beltway, with the University of North Florida's campus situated across I-295 from the center.

Key tenants include Anthropologie, Apple, Nordstrom, Dillard's, Lucky Brand Jeans, Urban Outfitters, Dick's Sporting Goods, P.F. Chang's China Bistro, Maggiano's Little Italy, The Cheesecake Factory, Target Corporation, and Barnes & Noble.

Expansion
A  expansion was opened to the public on October 26, 2007. It consists of about 40 retailers and 4 restaurants. Some of the tenants of this expansion include Aldo, Barnes & Noble, Brooks Brothers, Clarks, Coach, Lacoste, Louis Vuitton, MAC Cosmetics, Pottery Barn, Swarovski, Talbots, Tommy Bahama, Urban Outfitters, and West Elm. In 2008 True Religion, Kate Spade, The Capital Grille and J. Alexander's were opened.

On November 23, 2013, Macklemore & Ryan Lewis performed at the St. Johns Town Center for the grand opening of the Microsoft Store but the Microsoft Store closed in 2020. On October 10, 2014 Nordstrom opened its first store in Northeast Florida at the St. Johns Town Center. Eight other stores would open two days prior, including a 2-story Arhaus.

Condominiums were established in 2006 behind the St. Johns Town Center as part of further expansion. Additional apartments and hotels were also built since the center opened.

Additional shops, retail complexes and entertainment venues in its adjacent vicinity have been constructed since its opening (including a Sprouts Farmers Market, TopGolf facility, and an IKEA store about one mile away), with additional outlets under development as of 2019.

References 

Buildings and structures in Jacksonville, Florida
Shopping malls in Florida
Economy of Jacksonville, Florida
Shopping malls established in 2005
Simon Property Group
Tourist attractions in Jacksonville, Florida
Southside, Jacksonville